Klebsiella variicola is a species of bacteria which was originally identified as a benign endosymbiont in plants, but has since been associated with disease in humans and cattle as well.

Description
Klebsiella variicola was described as a species of Klebsiella distinct from its closely related species Klebsiella pneumoniae in 2004. Like other Klebsiella species, K. variicola is gram-negative, rod-shaped, non-motile, and covered by a polysaccharide capsule.

Hosts
Klebsiella variicola is known to associate with a number of different plants including banana trees, sugarcane and has been isolated from the fungal gardens of leaf-cutter ants. Some K. variicola strains have been associated with disease in humans, suggesting they may be able to serve as opportunistic pathogens of humans. K. variicola have also been isolated from cows suffering from bovine mastitis.

References

External links
Type strain of Klebsiella variicola at BacDive -  the Bacterial Diversity Metadatabase

Enterobacteriaceae
Bacteria described in 2004